Eisenhower State Park is the name of two state parks in the United States:

Eisenhower State Park (Kansas), a state park in Kansas
Eisenhower State Park (Texas), a state park in Texas